Snakedance is the second serial of the 20th season of the British science fiction television series Doctor Who, which was first broadcast in four twice-weekly parts on BBC1 from 18 to 26 January 1983.

The serial is set on the planet Manussa 500 years after the serial Kinda (1982). In the serial, the Mara takes over the bodies of the Doctor's companion Tegan (Janet Fielding) and Lon (Martin Clunes), the ruler's son, while seeking to manifest itself by using a crystal.

Plot
The arrival of the TARDIS on Manussa triggers nightmares in Tegan, who dreams of a snake-shaped cave mouth. When she and The Fifth Doctor find the cave from her dream, Tegan runs away. Alone and confused, Tegan lapses under the control of the Mara once more.

Manussa is in the grip of a festival of celebration of the banishment of the Mara from the civilisation five hundred years earlier. In the absence of the Federator, who rules over the three-planet Federation, his indolent son Lon is to have a major role in the celebration, supported by his mother the Lady Tanha and the archaeologist Ambri. Lon believes the Mara might one day return as prophesied, but Ambril is unconvinced. The young deputy curator Chela is more sympathetic and gives the Doctor a small blue crystal called a Little Mind's Eye, which is used by the Snakedancers, a mystical cult, in their ceremonies to repel the Mara. The Doctor realises the small crystal and its large counterpart, the Great Mind's Eye, can be used as focal points for mental energy and can turn thought into matter. This, he determines, is how the Mara will transfer from Tegan's mind to corporeal existence.

Tegan and Lon visit the cave from Tegan's dream, where Lon notices a wall pattern which could accommodate the Great Mind's Eye. Lon is sent back to the Palace while she causes more havoc and takes control of a showman, Dugdale. Lon tries to persuade Ambril to use the Great Mind's Eye in the ceremony, placing it in a position that will enable the Mara to return.

The Doctor uses the Little Mind's Eye to contact Ambril's predecessor Dojjen, who lives in sandy dunes beyond the city. They venture there and the Doctor communes with Dojjen by opening his mind after being bitten by a poisonous snake. He is told by the wise old snakedancer that the Mara may only be defeated by finding a still point in the mind. All three head back to the city to prevent the ceremony of defeating the Mara using the real Great Mind's Eye. The festivities are now at a peak, with a procession taking place which culminates in a ceremony at the cave. Lon plays the role of his ancestor Federator in rejecting the Mara. After a series of verbal challenges he seizes the real Great Mind's Eye and places it in the appropriate place on the wall. Tegan and Dugdale arrive and she displays the Mara mark on her arm, which is now becoming flesh having fed on the fear in Dugdale's mind. With the crystal in place, the Mara is able to create itself in the cave, becoming a vast and deadly snake. However, the Doctor arrives in time and refuses to look at the snake or recognise its evil, relying instead on the still place he finds through mental commune with Dojjen via the Little Mind's Eye. This resistance interrupts the manifestation of the Mara and its three slaves are freed while the snake itself dies and rots. The Doctor comforts a distraught Tegan, sure that the Mara has at last been destroyed.

Production
In post-production, episode four of this story overran very badly. As a result, it had to be completely restructured. Originally the door for a third Mara adventure was to be left open, with closing scenes discussing the ultimate fate of the Great Crystal. Furthermore, a sequence in which the Doctor comforts Tegan had to be removed. The scene was reincorporated into the beginning of the subsequent serial, Mawdryn Undead (1983).

Script editor Eric Saward commissioned Bailey to write a third and final story to feature the Mara, May Time. However, the story was abandoned due to production problems.

Cast notes
Martin Clunes made his television debut as Lon. Brian Miller was the husband of Elisabeth Sladen, who portrayed long-time companion Sarah Jane Smith. He later appeared in "Deep Breath" in Series 8 (2014), as well as playing Harry Sowersby in The Mad Woman in the Attic (2009), a story of The Sarah Jane Adventures, and providing Dalek voices for both Resurrection of the Daleks (1984) and Remembrance of the Daleks (1988). Brian Grellis previously played Sheprah in Revenge of the Cybermen (1975) and Safran in The Invisible Enemy (1977).

Broadcast and reception

In Doctor Who: The Episode Guide, Mark Campbell awarded it seven out of ten, describing it as "less experimental than Kinda" but still containing "some good moments", although he concluded that "Martin Clunes and Colette O'Neill are the best things in it". Mark Braxton of Radio Times awarded it two stars out of five, describing it as "a firm fan favourite" but a "limp sequel to Kinda", adding "where Kinda had bravura performances and genuinely unsettling moments, here the coils of plot and subtext hang rather limply". He observed a "lack of genuine jeopardy, pace or thrills", but described the guest cast as "solid" and praised Janet Fielding's performance and Fiona Cumming's direction of the "surreal possession scenes". He ended by stating that it was "competent" and "colourful enough" but found it "a stretch to understand quite why Snakedance is so beloved".

Commercial releases

In print

A novelisation of this serial, written by Terrance Dicks, was published by Target Books in January 1984. It was the first of two (the other being Enlightenment) to feature Peter Davison's image in the logo.

Home media
Snakedance was released on VHS in December 1994. It was released on DVD on 7 March 2011 along with Kinda in a special edition boxset entitled "Mara Tales". This serial was also released as part of the Doctor Who DVD Files in Issue 103 on 12 December 2012.

References

External links

Target novelisation

Fifth Doctor serials
Doctor Who serials novelised by Terrance Dicks
1983 British television episodes